Attia Nasreddin is a businessman of Eritrean origin who currently serves as the chief executive officer and chair of the Nasco Group in Nigeria (net worth: $1.2 billion).

Personal life 

Nasreddin was born in Eritrea  . He has a bachelor's degree in political science from the American College of Switzerland.

Business activities

Nasco Group 

The Nasco Group was established in Jos in 1963 by Nasreddin's father. The company grew to become a major conglomerate with four major manufacturing units and other investments in the service sector. The company has a strong focus on agro-business and is involved in backward integration in this sector.

In 1981, Nasreddin became the managing director of Nasco Estate Company Limited, Lagos, Nigeria. By 1983, he had become Vice President of Nasco International, Milan Italy. In 1990, he assumed the office of President of Nasco Group Nigeria Limited, until 1999, when he was elevated this time as the Vice Chairman of Nasco Group International Milan Italy. Since 2004 Nasreddin had served as chairman/CEO of Nasco Group Limited Jos.

Awards and recognition 

Nasreddin is a recipient of the Rotary Foundation's Paul Harris Fellow award, in appreciation of his role in the furtherance of global peace. In 1997, the Institute of Corporate Administrators of Nigeria awarded him a Fellowship for distinguishing himself in the field of Administration.

The Nigerian Institute of Public Relations (NIPR) awarded Nasreddin the Leadership Award in Corporate Governance.

The Nigerian Social Insurance Trust Fund gave Nasreddin the Most Valuable Employer Award. He received the Bankers Company Award in 2003 awarded by the Financial Times of London, whilst the National Institute for Policy and Strategic Studies gave him recognition for his support to strategic studies in the institute.

References

External links
 Official website
 Nasco Nigeria

Nigerian food industry businesspeople
Living people
Year of birth missing (living people)
Nigerian people of Eritrean descent
Nigerian chairpersons of corporations